James Valentine Campbell (February 25, 1823 – March 26, 1890) was a member of the Michigan Supreme Court from 1858 to 1890.

Campbell was born in Buffalo, New York but was brought to Detroit at a very young age. Campbell served as a law professor at the University of Michigan for much of the time he was on the Michigan Supreme Court. One biography of Campbell summed his life up as follows:

Sources
bio of Campbell

References

1823 births
1890 deaths
Lawyers from Buffalo, New York
Lawyers from Detroit
Members of the Detroit Board of Education
Justices of the Michigan Supreme Court
University of Michigan Law School faculty
University of Michigan Law School alumni
19th-century American judges
19th-century American lawyers